Manu Bhaker is an Indian Olympian who competes at airgun shooting. She represented India at the 2018 ISSF World Cup and won two gold medals. She is the youngest Indian to win a gold medal at the ISSF World Cup. She won the gold medal in women's 10 m air pistol event at 2018 Commonwealth Games just at the age of 16 in her maiden Commonwealth Games appearance.

Early life
She is from Goria village in the Haryana district of Jhajjar.
Her father, Ram Kishan Bhaker, works as a chief engineer in the Merchant Navy. Until the age of 14 Bhaker excelled in other sports like Huyen langlon, a Manipuri martial art, as well as boxing, tennis and skating, winning medals at the national games in these events.

Career
With an investment of ₹150000 by her father, Bhaker decided to take up competitive shooting. She first tasted success at the international level when she won the silver medal at the 2017 Asian Junior Championships. In the 2017 National games held at Kerala, Bhaker won nine gold medals and defeated multiple World Cup medalist Heena Sidhu and broke Sidhu's record of 240.8 points, scoring 242.3 points in the final.

In the 2018 International Shooting Sport Federation World Cup held at Guadalajara, Mexico. Bhaker won the gold medal in the Women's 10-meter air pistol, defeating Mexico's Alejandra Zavala, a two-time champion. Bhaker scored 237.5 the final match against Zavalaa, who scored 237.1. By winning the gold medal at age 16, Bhaker became the youngest Indian to win a gold medal at the World Cup.

Bhaker won her second gold medal at the World Cup in the 10-meter Air Pistol mixed team event. She was paired with fellow countrymen Om Prakash Mitharval. The pair shot a score of 476.1 points, defeating Sandra Reitz and Christian Reitz who scored 475.2.

Bhaker scored 388/400 points at 2018 Commonwealth Games in women's 10m air pistol qualifying round and qualified for the finals. In the final round of the women's 10m air pistol event during the Gold Coast Commonwealth Games, she secured the gold medal with setting a new Commonwealth Games record of 240.9 points.

In 2018 Asian Games, she scored a game's record score of 593 in the qualification round of 25m Air pistol event. But she failed to win a medal there, as she finished 6th in the final. Eventually, her compatriot Rahi Sarnobat clinched the Gold in this event.

At the Youth Olympics 2018, 
Manu Bhaker shot 236.5 to stand at the top of the points table in the women's 10m air pistol event. The Indian flag bearer at the opening ceremony of the Youth Olympics is also the World Cup and Commonwealth Games gold medalist. The 16-year-old Manu became the first shooter from India and the first female athlete from India to grab a gold medal at the Youth Olympic Games.

In February 2019 she won the gold medal in the 10m air pistol mixed team event at 2019 ISSF World Cup in Delhi.

In May 2019 she qualified for the 2020 Tokyo Olympics in the 10m pistol event via a fourth place finish at the Munich ISSF World Cup. This came days after her pistol jammed in the finals of the 25m pistol event when she was leading, eventually forcing her to forfeit due to her gun not being able to fire.

In all the four Pistol & Rifle ISSF World Cups in 2019, she won the gold medal in the 10m air pistol mixed event with Saurabh Chaudhry as her partner, making the pair a strong contender for the 2020 Tokyo Olympics.

International career

Olympic Games

World Championship

Youth Olympics

Junior World Championship

Junior World Cup

World Cup

10m air pistol Event

25m Pistol Event

Mixed Team Event

References

External links
 

2002 births
Living people
People from Jhajjar
Indian female sport shooters
Sport shooters from Haryana
Commonwealth Games gold medallists for India
Commonwealth Games medallists in shooting
Shooters at the 2018 Commonwealth Games
Shooters at the 2018 Asian Games
Shooters at the 2018 Summer Youth Olympics
Asian Games competitors for India
Youth Olympic gold medalists for India
Recipients of the Arjuna Award
Shooters at the 2020 Summer Olympics
Olympic shooters of India
Medallists at the 2018 Commonwealth Games